Tony Destra (September 20, 1954 – February 8, 1987), was an American drummer who played for the glam metal bands Cinderella and Britny Fox.  Before Cinderella or Britny Fox, Tony was the drummer for another popular Philadelphia area band called Enforcer. The singer for Enforcer was Bill Mattson who would gain later recognition as the frontman for Tangier. Tony played on Cinderella's indy 45 of "Shake Me" and "Somebody Save Me". After he left Cinderella, he joined Britny Fox in 1985. He played on the Britny Fox demo In America in 1986. Tony died in a car accident on February 8, 1987.

In Cinderella, he was replaced by drummer Jim Drnec. In Britny Fox he was replaced by drummer Adam F Ferraioli who was then himself replaced by long-term drummer Johnny Dee.

Discography

With Cinderella
Demos

With Britny Fox
In America (demo) (1986)

References

1954 births
1987 deaths
Road incident deaths in Pennsylvania
American rock drummers
Glam metal musicians
Cinderella (band) members
Britny Fox members
20th-century American drummers
American male drummers
20th-century American male musicians